Ralph Lake is a lake located on Vancouver Island. It is an expansion of Ralph River east  of Buttle Lake.

References

Alberni Valley
Lakes of Vancouver Island
Nootka Land District